SS Weser can refer to any of three ships originally owned and operated by North German Lloyd:

, built in 1858
, built in 1867
, built in 1922

It can also refer to a Bugsier Reederei und Bergungs ship
, built in 1910

It can also refer to a number of German fishing boats and vorpostenboote
, later V 301 Weser
, later ON 117, PG 467 and V 304 Breslau

Ship names